China Gold International Resources Corp. Ltd. is a mining and exploration company registered and headquartered in British Columbia, and listed on the Toronto Stock Exchange. China Gold holds a minority stake of 39.9% of its shares.

Corporate structure
China Gold International is the only overseas vehicle of China National Gold Group, which is a central level, state owned enterprise as well as the largest gold producer in China. This relationship allows the Company to leverage China National Gold's engineering and operating knowledge, as well as their financing capabilities.

Operations
The aims of the company are to grow production both at its current mining operations in China and through an acquisition and development strategy targeting international projects.

The company operates two producing mines, the CSH Gold Mine in Inner Mongolia, and the Jiama Copper-Polymetallic Mine in Tibet Autonomous Region of China.

Legal issues 
On March 29, 2013, 83 miners were buried in a landslide at the Gyama mine site in Tibet. In 2014 Canada's national contact point for the OECD received a Request for Review regarding the mining activities of China Gold in the Gyama Valley.They made six recommendations regarding disclosure, employment and industrial relations, the environment, and  human rights.

References

External links 
 
 http://www.international.gc.ca/trade-agreements-accords-commerciaux/ncp-pcn/statement-gyama-valley.aspx?lang=eng
 https://business-humanrights.org/en/china-gold-subject-to-withdrawal-of-canadian-govt-trade-support-due-alleged-abuses-in-tibet-says-oecd-natl-contact-point
 
 https://www.economist.com/news/china/21575783-fatal-landslide-tibet-raises-questions-about-rush-regions-resources-price

Companies listed on the Toronto Stock Exchange
Companies listed on the Hong Kong Stock Exchange
Gold mining companies of Canada
Gold mining in China